Henry M. Vaupel (born December 11, 1943) is an American politician who has served in the Michigan House of Representatives from the 47th district since 2015.

References

1943 births
Living people
Republican Party members of the Michigan House of Representatives
21st-century American politicians
Politicians from Detroit